Opuntia, commonly called prickly pear or pear cactus, is a genus of flowering plants in the cactus family Cactaceae. Prickly pears are also known as tuna (fruit), sabra, nopal (paddle, plural nopales) from the Nahuatl word  for the pads, or nostle, from the Nahuatl word  for the fruit; or paddle cactus. The genus is named for the Ancient Greek city of Opus, where, according to Theophrastus, an edible plant grew and could be propagated by rooting its leaves. The most common culinary species is the Indian fig opuntia (O. ficus-indica).

Description 

Prickly pears typically grow with flat, rounded cladodes (also called platyclades) containing large, smooth, fixed spines and small, hairlike prickles called glochids that readily adhere to skin or hair, then detach from the plant. The flowers are typically large, axillary, solitary, bisexual, and epiperigynous, with a perianth consisting of distinct, spirally arranged tepals and a hypanthium. The stamens are numerous and in spiral or whorled clusters, and the gynoecium has numerous inferior ovaries per carpel. Placentation is parietal, and the fruit is a berry with arillate seeds. Prickly pear species can vary greatly in habit; most are shrubs, but some, such as Opuntia galapageia of the Galápagos, are trees.

Growth

Chemistry 
Opuntia contains a range of phytochemicals in variable quantities, such as polyphenols, dietary minerals and betalains. Identified compounds under basic research include gallic acid, vanillic acid and catechins, as examples. The Sicilian prickly pear contains betalain, betanin, and indicaxanthin, with highest levels in their fruits.

Taxonomy 
[[File:Opuntia Cactus in Behbahan.jpg|alt=O. lindheimeri blooming, Behbahan|thumb|O. lindheimeri, Behbahan]]

When Carl Linnaeus published Species Plantarum in 1753 – the starting point for modern botanical nomenclature – he placed all the species of cactus known to him in one genus, Cactus. In 1754, the Scottish botanist Philip Miller divided them into several genera, including Opuntia. He distinguished the genus largely on the form of its flowers and fruits.

Considerable variation of taxonomy occurs within Opuntia species, resulting in names being created for variants or subtypes within a species, and use of DNA sequencing to define and isolate various species.

SpeciesOpuntia hybridizes readily between species. This can make classification difficult, yielding a reticulate phylogeny where different species come together in hybridization. Opuntia also has a tendency for polyploidy. The ancestral diploid state was 2n=22, but many species are hexaploid (6n = 66) or octaploid (8n = 88). 

Species accepted by Plants of the World Online, are listed below, together with some species accepted by other sources, where the name preferred by Plants of the World Online is also given.Opuntia abjecta Small ex Britton & RoseOpuntia aciculata Griffiths – Chenille prickly pear, old man's whiskers, cowboy's red whiskers
Opuntia × aequatorialis Britton & Rose
Opuntia × alta GriffithsOpuntia altomagdalenensis XhonneuxOpuntia amarilla GriffithsOpuntia ammophila, synonym of Opuntia austrinaOpuntia anacantha, synonym of Opuntia elata var. elataOpuntia anahuacensis Griffiths
Opuntia × andersonii H.M.Hern., Gómez-Hin. & BárcenasOpuntia arechavaletae Speg.Opuntia arenaria, synonym of Opuntia polyacantha var. arenaria – dune prickly pear; diploid (2n=22)Opuntia articulata, synonym of Tephrocactus articulatusOpuntia atrispina GriffithsOpuntia auberi Pfeiff.Opuntia aurantiaca Lindl.Opuntia aurea E.M.Baxter – hexaploid (2n=66)Opuntia aureispina (S.Brack & K.D.Heil) Pinkava & B.D.ParfittOpuntia austrina SmallOpuntia azurea RoseOpuntia basilaris Engelm. & J.M.Bigelow – beavertail cactus; diploid (2n=22)Opuntia bentonii, synonym of Opuntia strictaOpuntia bonplandii (Kunth) F.A.C.WeberOpuntia bravoana E.M.BaxterOpuntia caboensis F.Mercado & León de la LuzOpuntia cacanapa, synonym of Opuntia engelmannii var. cacanapaOpuntia camanchica Engelm. & J.M.BigelowOpuntia caracassana Salm-Dyck
Opuntia × carstenii R.Puente & C.HamannOpuntia cespitosa Raf.Opuntia chaffeyi Britton & Rose
Opuntia × charlestonensis ClokeyOpuntia chiangiana Scheinvar & ManzaneroOpuntia chisosensis (M.S.Anthony) D.J.FergusonOpuntia chlorotica Engelm. & J.M.Bigelow – pancake prickly pear; native to southwest USA and the Sonoran and Mojave deserts; diploid (2n=22)Opuntia clarkiorum RebmanOpuntia cochenillifera (L.) Mill.
Opuntia × cochinera Griffiths
Opuntia × coloradensis D.J.Barnett & Donnie Barnett
Opuntia × columbiana GriffithsOpuntia crassa Haw.Opuntia crystalenia GriffithsOpuntia cubensis Britton & RoseOpuntia curassavica (L.) Mill.
Opuntia × curvispina GriffithsOpuntia deamii Rose
Opuntia × debreczyi SzutoriszOpuntia decumbens Salm-DyckOpuntia dejecta Salm-DyckOpuntia delafuentiana Martínez-Gonz., Luna-Vega, Gallegos & García-Sand.
Opuntia × demissa GriffithsOpuntia depressa RoseOpuntia dillenii (Ker Gawl.) Haw.Opuntia diploursina, synonym of Opuntia polyacantha var. erinacea – found around Grand Canyon and Lake Mead National Recreation Area; diploid (2n=22); resembles O. trichophoraOpuntia discolor Britton & RoseOpuntia drummondii GrahamOpuntia dulcis Engelm.Opuntia echinocarpa - see Cylindropuntia echinocarpaOpuntia eichlamii RoseOpuntia elata Link & Otto ex Salm-DyckOpuntia elatior Mill.Opuntia elizondoana E.Sánchez & VillaseñorOpuntia engelmannii Salm-Dyck ex Engelm. – Engelmann's prickly pear, cow's-tongue prickly pear, desert prickly pear, discus prickly pear, Texas prickly pear, calico cactus; hexaploid (2n=66)Opuntia escuintlensis (Matuda) LodéOpuntia excelsa Sánchez-Mej.Opuntia feroacantha Britton & RoseOpuntia ficus-indica (L.) Mill. – Indian fig opuntia, cultivatedOpuntia fragilis (Nutt.) Haw. – little prickly pear, brittle cactus, found in the Great Plains, parts of the Midwest and in several Canadian provinces, up to 56°N. Opuntia fuliginosa GriffithsOpuntia galapageia Hensl. – Galápagos prickly pear, Galápagos IslandsOpuntia gallegiana Scheinvar & OlaldeOpuntia gosseliniana F.A.C.Weber – violet prickly pearOpuntia guatemalensis Britton & RoseOpuntia guilanchii GriffithsOpuntia hitchcockii J.G.OrtegaOpuntia hondurensis Standl.Opuntia howeyi J.A.PurpusOpuntia huajuapensis BravoOpuntia humifusa (Raf.) Raf. – eastern prickly pear (sometimes included in O. compressa); tetraploid (2n=44); range includes humid regions of Eastern United States and northerly regions into CanadaOpuntia hyptiacantha F.A.C.WeberOpuntia inaequilateralis A.BergerOpuntia inaperta (Schott ex Griffiths) D.R.HuntOpuntia invicta, synonym of Grusonia invictaOpuntia jaliscana BravoOpuntia lagunae E.M.BaxterOpuntia lasiacantha Pfeiff.Opuntia leucotricha DC. – arborescent prickly pear, Aaron's beard cactus, semaphore cactus, Duraznillo blanco, nopal blancoOpuntia lindheimeri – cowtongue prickly pearOpuntia littoralis (Engelm.) Cockerell – coastal prickly pear, sprawling prickly pearOpuntia lutea (Rose) D.R.HuntOpuntia mackensenii RoseOpuntia macrocentra Engelm. – black-spined prickly pear, purple prickly pear, found in southwest USA and northern MexicoOpuntia macrorhiza Engelm. – Plains prickly pear, found throughout the Great Plains except for the northernmost areas (not found in North Dakota), and extending sporadically eastward as far as Kentucky; tetraploid (2n=44)Opuntia mantaroensis GuiggiOpuntia matudae Scheinvar – xoconostle (syn. O. joconostle)Opuntia maxima Mill.Opuntia megapotamica Arechav.Opuntia megarrhiza RoseOpuntia mesacantha Raf.Opuntia microdasys (Lehm.) Pfeiff. – bunny ears cactus, polka-dot cactusOpuntia militaris Britton & RoseOpuntia monacanthos (Willd.) Haw. (also spelt O. monacantha) – common prickly pearOpuntia nemoralis Griffiths
Opuntia × occidentalis Engelm. & J.M.BigelowOpuntia ochrocentra Small ex Britton & RoseOpuntia orbiculata Salm-Dyck ex Pfeiff.Opuntia oricola PhilbrickOpuntia pachyrrhiza H.M.Hern., Gómez-Hin. & BárcenasOpuntia pailana, synonym of O. leucotrichaOpuntia parviclada S.Arias & GamaOpuntia peckii J.A.PurpusOpuntia perotensis Scheinvar, Olalde & GallegosOpuntia phaeacantha Engelm. – tulip prickly pear, includes plateau prickly pear, brown-spined prickly pear, Mojave prickly pear, Kingman prickly pear; hexaploid (2n=66)Opuntia picardoi, synonym of Airampoa erectocladaOpuntia pilifera F.A.C.WeberOpuntia pinkavae B.D.Parfitt – Pinkava prickly pear; octoploid (2n=88), named in honor of Donald John PinkavaOpuntia pittieri Britton & RoseOpuntia polyacantha Haw. – Plains prickly pear, Starvation Prickly pear, Panhandle prickly pear, found in the Great Plains, Great Basin, Mojave Desert, Colorado Plateau, and the Rocky Mountains, syn. Opuntia rhodantha K.Schum.; tetraploid (2n=44)Opuntia pottsii Salm-DyckOpuntia preciadoae Scheinvar, Olalde, Gallegos & J.Morales S.Opuntia puberula Pfeiff.Opuntia pubescens H.L.Wendl. ex Pfeiff.Opuntia pycnantha Engelm.Opuntia quimilo K.Schum.Opuntia quitensis F.A.C.Weber – Red Buttons opuntia (syn. Opuntia macbridei, Opuntia johnsonii, Platyopuntia quitensis)Opuntia rastrera F.A.C.WeberOpuntia repens BelloOpuntia retrorsa Speg.Opuntia ritteri A.BergerOpuntia robinsonii J.G.OrtegaOpuntia robusta H.L.Wendl. ex Pfeiff.

Opuntia × rooneyi M.P.Griff.Opuntia rufida Engelm.Opuntia rzedowskii ScheinvarOpuntia sanguinea ProctorOpuntia scheeri F.A.C.WeberOpuntia schumannii F.A.C.Weber ex A.BergerOpuntia setispina Engelm., synonym of Opuntia pottsiiOpuntia setocarpa Arreola-Nava, Guzm.-Hern. & CuevasOpuntia sierralagunensis León de la Luz & F.MercadoOpuntia soederstromiana Britton & RoseOpuntia spinosibacca M.S.AnthonyOpuntia spinulifera Salm-DyckOpuntia stenarthra K.Schum.Opuntia stenopetala Engelm.Opuntia streptacantha Lem.Opuntia stricta (Haw.) Haw. – erect prickly pear, spineless prickly pearOpuntia strigil Engelm.Opuntia sulphurea G.Don ex Salm-DyckOpuntia tapona Engelm. ex J.M.Coult.Opuntia tehuacana S.Arias & U.GuzmánOpuntia tehuantepecana (Bravo) BravoOpuntia tezontepecana Gallegos & ScheinvarOpuntia tomentosa Salm-Dyck – woollyjoint prickly pearOpuntia tortispina Engelm. & J.M.BigelowOpuntia triacanthos (Willd.) Sweet (also spelt Opuntia triacantha)Opuntia trichophora diploid (2n=22)Opuntia tuna (L.) Mill.Opuntia tunoidea Gibbes
Opuntia × vaseyi (J.M.Coult.) Britton & RoseOpuntia velutina F.A.C.WeberOpuntia wilcoxii Britton & RoseOpuntia zacuapanensis A.BergerOpuntia zamudioi Scheinvar

Formerly in Opuntia

 Austrocylindropuntia Brasiliopuntia Corynopuntia Cylindropuntia Disocactus phyllanthoides (as O. speciosa)
 Micropuntia MiqueliopuntiaChollas

Chollas, now recognized to belong to the distinct genus Cylindropuntia, are distinguished by having cylindrical, rather than flattened, stem segments with large barbed spines. The stem joints of several species, notably the jumping cholla (C. fulgida), are very brittle on young stems, readily breaking off when the barbed spines stick to clothing or animal fur as a method of vegetative reproduction. The barbed spines can remain embedded in the skin, causing discomfort and sometimes injury.

 Breeding 
One of the ancient homes of the cactus pear, Mexico, ran a breeding program in the 1960s. This effort at the Antonio Narro Agrarian Autonomous University (Universidad Autónoma Agraria Antonio Narro, UAAAN) produced improvements in some traits including cold-hardiness.

Distribution and habitat

Like most true cactus species, prickly pears are native only to the Americas. Through human actions, they have since been introduced to many other areas of the world. Prickly pear species are found in abundance in Mexico, especially in the central and western regions, and in the Caribbean islands (West Indies). In the United States, prickly pears are native to many areas of the arid, semiarid, and drought-prone Western and South Central United States, including the lower elevations of the Rocky Mountains and southern Great Plains, where species such as O. phaeacantha and O. polyacantha become dominant, and to the desert Southwest, where several types are endemic. Prickly pear cactus is also native to sandy coastal beach scrub environments of the East Coast from Florida to southern Connecticut, where O. humifusa, O. stricta, and O. pusilla, are found from the East Coast south into the Caribbean and the Bahamas.  Additionally, the eastern prickly pear is native to the midwestern "sand prairies" nearby major river systems, such as the Mississippi, Illinois, and Ohio rivers. The plant also occurs naturally in hilly areas of southern Illinois, and sandy or rocky areas of northern Illinois.Opuntia species are the most cold-tolerant of the lowland cacti, extending into western and southern Canada; one subspecies, O. fragilis var. fragilis, has been found growing along the Beatton River in central British Columbia, southwest of Cecil Lake at 56° 17’ N latitude and 120° 39’ W longitude. Others are seen in the Kleskun Hills Natural Area of north-west Alberta at 55° 15’ 30’’ N latitude and 118° 30’ 36’’ W longitude.

Prickly pears also produce a fruit, commonly eaten in Mexico and in the Mediterranean region, known as tuna; it also is used to make aguas frescas. The fruit can be red, wine-red, green, or yellow-orange. In the Galápagos Islands, the Galápagos prickly pear, O. galapageia, has previously been treated as a number of different species, but is now only divided into varieties and subvarieties. Most of these are confined to one or a few islands, so they have been described as "an excellent example of adaptive radiation". On the whole, islands with tall, trunked varieties have giant tortoises, and islands lacking tortoises have low or prostrate forms of Opuntia. Prickly pears are a prime source of food for the common giant tortoises in the Galápagos Islands, so they are important in the food web.

Charles Darwin was the first to note that these cacti have thigmotactic anthers; when the anthers are touched, they curl over, depositing their pollen. This movement can be seen by gently poking the anthers of an open Opuntia flower. The same trait has evolved convergently in other species (e.g. Lophophora).

The first introduction of prickly pears into Australia is ascribed to Governor Phillip and the earliest colonists in 1788. Brought from Brazil to Sydney, prickly pear grew in Sydney, New South Wales, where they were rediscovered in a farmer's garden in 1839. They appear to have spread from New South Wales and caused great ecological damage in the eastern states. They are also found in the Mediterranean region of Northern Africa, especially in Algeria, Morocco and Tunisia, where they grow all over the countryside, and in parts of Southern Europe, especially Spain, where they grow in the east, south-east, and south of the country, and also in Malta, where they grow all over the islands. They can be found in enormous numbers in parts of South Africa, where they were introduced from South America.
Prickly pears are considered an invasive species in Australia, Ethiopia, South Africa, and Hawaii, among other locations.

Prickly pears (mostly O. stricta) were originally imported into Europe during the 1500s and Australia in the 18th century for gardens, and were later used as a natural agricultural fencing and in an attempt to establish a cochineal dye industry. In 1919, the Australian federal government established the Commonwealth Prickly Pear Board to coordinate efforts with state governments to eradicate the weed. Early attempts at mechanical removal and poisonous chemicals failed, so in a last resort, biological control was attempted. The moth Cactoblastis cactorum, from South America, whose larvae eat prickly pear, was introduced in 1925 and rapidly reduced the cactus population. Alan Dodd, the son of the noted entomologist Frederick Parkhurst Dodd, was a leading official in combating the prickly pear menace. A memorial hall in Chinchilla, Queensland, commemorates the moth. The release of cochineal insects that eat the cactus and simultaneously kill the plant has proven an effective measure for combatting the spread.

Natural distribution occurs via consumption and seed dispersal by many animals, including antelopes, nonhuman primates, elephants, birds, and humans. When ingested by elephants, the sharp components of the plant cause harm to the mouth, stomach, and intestines.

 Ecology O. ficus-indica thrives in regions with mild winters having a prolonged dry spell followed by hot summers with occasional rain and relatively low humidity. A mean annual rainfall of  provides good growth rates. O. ficus-indica proliferates in various soils ranging from subacid to subalkaline, with clay content not exceeding 15–20% and the soil well-drained. The shallow root system enables the plant to grow in shallow, loose soils, such as on mountain slopes. Opuntia spreads into large clonal colonies, which contribute to its being considered a noxious weed in some places.

Animals that eat Opuntia include the prickly pear island snail and Cyclura rock iguanas. The fruit are relished by many arid-land animals, chiefly birds, which thus help distribute the seeds. Opuntia pathogens include the sac fungus Colletotrichum coccodes and Sammons' Opuntia virus. The ant Crematogaster opuntiae and the spider Theridion opuntia are named because of their association with prickly pear cactus.

 Toxicity 
Although the plants are edible, the pointed hairs should not be eaten, and similar species with milky sap are suspect.

 Uses 

Nutrition
Raw opuntia leaves are 88% water, 10% carbohydrates, and less than 1% both of protein and fat. In a  reference serving, raw leaves provide  of food energy, 17% of the Daily Value (DV) for vitamin C, and 24% DV for magnesium, with no other micronutrients in significant content.

Regional food uses

The fruit of prickly pears, commonly called cactus fruit, cactus fig, Indian fig (meaning "Native American", not India), nopales or tuna in Spanish, is edible, although it must be peeled carefully to remove the small spines on the outer skin before consumption. If the outer layer is not properly removed, glochids can be ingested, causing discomfort of the throat, lips, and tongue, as the small spines are easily lodged in the skin. Native Americans like the Tequesta would roll the fruit around in a suitable medium (e.g. grit) to "sand" off the glochids. Alternatively, rotating the fruit in the flame of a campfire or torch has been used to remove the glochids. Today, parthenocarpic (seedless) cultivars are also available. The seeds can be used for flour.

In Mexico, prickly pears are often used to make appetizers, soups, salads, entrees, vegetable dishes, breads, desserts, beverages, candy, jelly, and drinks. The young stem segments, usually called pads or nopales, are also edible in most species of Opuntia. They are commonly used in Mexican cuisine in dishes such as huevos con nopales (eggs with nopal), or tacos de nopales. Nopales are also an important ingredient in New Mexican cuisine. In 2009 it was introduced as a cheaper alternative to corn for the production of tortillas and other corn products. They can also be pickled.Opuntia ficus-indica has been introduced to Europe, and flourishes in areas with a suitable climate, such as the south of France and southern Italy: In Sicily, they are referred to as fichi d'India (Italian literal translation of Indian fig) or ficurinia (Sicilian language literal translation of Indian fig). In Sardinia, they are called figumorisca – Moorish figs), the same denomination they receive along the Catalan-speaking regions of the Western Mediterranean, figa de moro. They can be found also in the Struma River in Bulgaria, in southern Portugal and Madeira (where they are called tabaibo, figo tuno, or "Indian figs"), in Andalusia, Spain (where they are known as higos chumbos).
In Greece, it grows in such places as the Peloponnese region, Ionian Islands, or Crete, and its figs are known as frangosyka (Frankish, i.e. Western European, figs) or pavlosyka (Paul's figs), depending on the region. In Albania, they are called fiq deti translated as 'sea figs', and are present in the south-west shore. The figs are also grown in Cyprus, where they are known as papoutsósyka or babutsa (shoe figs).

The prickly pear also grows widely on the islands of Malta, where it is enjoyed by the Maltese as a typical summer fruit (known as bajtar tax-xewk, literally 'spiny figs'), as well as being used to make the popular liqueur known as bajtra. The prickly pear is so commonly found in the Maltese islands, it is often used as a dividing wall between many of Malta's characteristic terraced fields in place of the usual rubble walls.

The prickly pear was introduced to Eritrea during the period of Italian colonisation between 1890 and 1940. It is locally known there as beles and is abundant during the late summer and early autumn (late July through September). The beles from the holy monastery of Debre Bizen is said to be particularly sweet and juicy.

In Morocco, Tunisia, Libya, Saudi Arabia, Jordan, and other parts of North Africa and the Middle East such as Israel, prickly pears of the yellow and orange varieties are grown by the side of farms, beside railway tracks and other otherwise noncultivable land. It is sold in summer by street vendors, and is considered a refreshing fruit for that season. In Libya, it is a popular summer fruit and called by the locals Hindi, which literally means Indian.Tungi is the local St. Helenian name for cactus pears. The plants (Indian fig opuntia) were originally brought to the island by the colonial ivory traders from East Africa in the 1850s. Tungi cactus now grows wild in the dry coastal regions of the island. Three principal cultivars of tungi grow on the island: the 'English' with yellow fruit; the 'Madeira' with large red fruit; and the small, firm 'spiny red'.Tungi also gives its name to a local Spirit distilled at The St Helena distillery at Alarm Forest, the most remote distillery in the world, made entirely from the opuntia cactus.

Cactus pear is being promoted and researched by ICARDA for India, Jordan, and Pakistan especially. It is an underappreciated crop in these countries and has undergone recent expansion in cultivated area. In some particularly promising areas of India and Pakistan it has given a 30% increase in milk yield /hectare (/acre).

Folk medicine
In Mexican folk medicine, its pulp and juice are considered treatments for wounds and inflammation of the digestive and urinary tracts, although there is no high-quality evidence for any clinical benefit of using opuntia for these purposes.

Prior to modern medicine, Native Americans and Mexicans primarily used Opuntia as a coagulant for open wounds, using the pulp of the stem either by splitting the stem or scraping out the pulp.

In one recent study, it was found that Opuntia aided in the prevention or slow down of diabetes, obesity, metabolic syndrome, cardiovascular disease, and some cancers. The results of the group that was taking Opuntia showed a reduction in BMI, body composition, and waist circumference when compared to the placebo group.

 Other uses 

 In dye production Dactylopius coccus is a scale insect from which cochineal dye is derived.  D. coccus itself is native to tropical and subtropical South America and Mexico. This insect, a primarily sessile parasite, lives on cacti from the genus Opuntia, feeding on moisture and nutrients in the cactus sap. The insect produces carminic acid, which deters predation by other insects. The carminic acid can be extracted from the insect's body and eggs to make the red dye.

Cochineal is used primarily as a red food colouring and for cosmetics. The cochineal dye was used by the Aztec and Maya peoples of Central and North America, and by the Inca in South America. Produced almost exclusively in Oaxaca, Mexico, by indigenous producers, cochineal became Mexico's second-most valued export after silver. The dyestuff was consumed throughout Europe, and was so highly valued, its price was regularly quoted on the London and Amsterdam Commodity Exchanges.

The biggest producers of cochineal are Peru, the Canary Islands, and Chile. Current health concerns over artificial food additives have renewed the popularity of cochineal dyes, and the increased demand is making cultivation for insect farming an attractive opportunity in other regions, such as in Mexico, where cochineal production had declined again owing to the numerous natural enemies of the scale insect.

Apart from cochineal, the red dye betanin can be extracted from some Opuntia plants themselves.

 For animal fodder 
Cactus is used as a fodder crop for animals in arid and dryland regions. Some farmers prepare it with a fermentation produce, to remove the spines, and increase the digestibility.

 As a source of "vegan leather" 
The thick skin of nopal cactus can be harvested as an environmentally-friendly leather replacement.

 For fuel 
Bioethanol can be produced from some Opuntia species.

 For bioplastic 
Nopal juice can be used to produce bioplastic.

 Culture 
The prickly pear cactus has been used for centuries both as a food source and a natural fence that keeps in livestock and marks the boundaries of family lands. They are resilient and often grow back following removal.

The 1975–1988 version of the emblem of Malta also featured a prickly pear, along with a traditional dgħajsa, a shovel and pitchfork, and the rising sun.

The cactus lends its name to a song by British jazz/classical group Portico Quartet. The song "My Rival", on the album Gaucho by the American jazz-pop group Steely Dan begins with the words, "The wind was driving in my face/The smell of prickly pear."

In the fall of 1961, Cuba had its troops plant a  barrier of Opuntia cactus along the northeastern section of the  fence surrounding the Guantanamo Bay Naval Base to stop Cubans from escaping Cuba to take refuge in the United States. This was dubbed the "Cactus Curtain", an allusion to Europe's Iron Curtain and the Bamboo Curtain in East Asia.

Uruguayan-born footballer Bruno Fornaroli is nicknamed prickly pear due to his sometimes spiky hairstyles.

 Mexico 

The coat of arms of Mexico depicts a Mexican golden eagle, perched upon an Opuntia cactus, holding a rattlesnake. According to the official history of Mexico, the coat of arms is inspired by an Aztec legend regarding the founding of Tenochtitlan. The Aztecs, then a nomadic tribe, were wandering throughout Mexico in search of a divine sign to indicate the precise spot upon which they were to build their capital. Their god Huitzilopochtli had commanded them to find an eagle devouring a snake, perched atop a cactus that grew on a rock submerged in a lake. After 200 years of wandering, they found the promised sign on a small island in the swampy Lake Texcoco. There they founded their new capital, Tenochtitlan. The cactus (O. ficus-indica; Nahuatl: tenochtli), full of fruits, is the symbol for the island of Tenochtitlan.

 Israeli-born Jew 

The cactus fig is called tzabar''' in Hebrew. This cactus is also the origin of the term "Sabra" used to describe any Jew born in Israel. The allusion is to a thorny, spiky skin on the outside, but a soft, sweet interior, suggesting, though the Israeli Sabras are rough on the outside, they are sweet and sensitive once one gets to know them. This term is might be derived from an Arabic word for this cactus صبار ṣubbār, where the related term sabr'' also translates to "patience" or "tenacity".

See also 
 Sabra (comics)
 Sabra (person)

References

External links
 
 
Argiope argentata#Habitat and distribution

 
Cacti of the United States
Cacti of Mexico
Cacti of South America
Flora of South America
Flora of Central America
North American desert flora
Mesoamerican cuisine
Ayahuasca
Desert fruits
Medicinal plants
Mexican cuisine
Mexican alcoholic drinks
Opuntioideae genera
Plants used in Native American cuisine
Taxa named by Philip Miller